An incomplete list of schools in Taiwan.

National chains
Taiwan Mandarin Institute
Hess Educational Organization
Joy English School
KOJEN English Language Schools

Keelung
National Keelung Commercial & Industrial Vocational Senior High School
Keelung Fu Jen Sacred Heart Senior High School

Taipei

Affiliated Senior High School of National Taiwan Normal University
 Asia American International Academy
Banqiao Senior High School
Broaden Media Academy
Cheng Kung Senior High School
Chingshin Academy
Dominican International School
Mandarin Daily News Language Center
National San Chung Senior High School
Datong High School
Taipei Private Yan Ping High School
Taipei American School
Taipei Adventist American School
Taipei European School
Taipei First Girls' High School
Taipei International Christian Academy
Taiwan Mandarin Institute
Taipei Municipal Jianguo High School
Taipei Municipal Jingmei Girls' High School
Taipei Municipal Lishan Senior High School
Taipei Municipal Neihu Senior High School
Taipei Municipal Song Shan Senior High School
Taipei Municipal Zhongshan Girls High School
Tsz-Shiou Senior High School

Hsinchu
Hsinchu American School
Hsinchu County American School
Hsinchu International School
National Experimental High School
National Hsinchu Girls' Senior High School
National Hsinchu Senior High School
Sagor Bilingual School

Taichung 
Cingshuei High School
Ming-Dao High School
Morrison Academy (branches in Taipei and Tainan)
National Wen-Hua Senior High School
American School in Taichung
National Dali High School

Tainan
Kuen Shan Senior High School
National Tainan Girls' Senior High School
National Tainan Second Senior High School
National Nanke International Experimental High School

Kaohsiung
Affiliated Senior High School of National Kaohsiung Normal University
Kaohsiung American School
Morrison Academy Kaohsiung
Kaohsiung Municipal Kaohsiung Senior High School
Pu-Men High School
I-Shou International School
 Dominican International School
Chung Shan Industrial and Commercial School
Guoguang Laboratory School, National Sun Yat-sen University
I-Shou International School
Kaohsiung Municipal Jhong-Jheng Senior High School
Kaohsiung Municipal Kaohsiung Girls' Senior High School
Kaohsiung Municipal Kaohsiung Senior High School
Kaohsiung Municipal Nanzih Comprehensive Senior High School
Kaohsiung Municipal Ruei-Siang Senior High School
Kaohsiung Municipal Sanmin Senior High School
Kaohsiung Municipal Tsoying Senior High School
National FengHsin Senior High School
National Fengshan Senior High School
National FongShan Senior Commercial & Industrial Vocational School
Pu-Men High School

Pingtung
National Chao-Chou Senior High School

See also
 Education in Taiwan
 List of law schools in Taiwan
 List of universities in Taiwan